John George Robertson (18 January 1867, Glasgow – 29 May 1933, London) was a philologist and professor of German language and literature.

Robertson graduated with M.A. and B.Sc. from the University of Glasgow and then Ph.D. (Promotion) from Leipzig University. From 1896 to 1903 he was a lecturer in English at the University of Strassburg. At the University of London, he became in 1903 Professor of German Language and Literature and in 1924 Director of the Department of Scandinavian Studies. He was the founding editor-in-chief of the Modern Language Review. He wrote several books dealing with the literature of Germany and about a dozen articles for the 1911 Encyclopedia Britannica. At the University of Oxford he delivered the 1924 Taylorian Lecture with title The Gods of Greece in German Poetry.

After his death his successor, and former pupil, Edna Purdie completed his work on Lessing's Hamburgische Dramaturgie which was published in 1939.

Private Life
Richardson married Ethel Florence Lindesay Richardson, who became a novelist under her pen name "Henry Handel Richardson". They met in 1889 in Leipzig where he was a doctoral student in philology and where she was a piano student. They married in Dublin on 30 December 1895.

Selected publications

References

External links

1867 births
1933 deaths
Alumni of the University of Glasgow
Leipzig University alumni
Germanists
Academics of the University of London
Academics from Glasgow